Hostetter is a light rail station in San Jose, California, United States. It is operated by the Santa Clara Valley Transportation Authority (VTA) and is served by the Orange Line.

The station, built as part of the Tasman East/Capitol extension from I-880/Milpitas station (now Alder station) to Alum Rock Transit Center, was originally intended as the terminus of phase two of the Tasman East project. However, phase two of the Tasman East extension and the Capitol extension were eventually opened on the same date on June 24, 2004.

Service

Location 
Hostetter station is located in the median of North Capitol Avenue, just south of Hostetter Road in San Jose, California.

Station layout

References

External links 

Hostetter Station – VTA

Santa Clara Valley Transportation Authority light rail stations
Santa Clara Valley Transportation Authority bus stations
Railway stations in San Jose, California
2004 establishments in California
Railway stations in the United States opened in 2004